Hyatung or Hyatrung Falls is the second highest waterfall in Asia and first in Nepal. It is located between Ishibu and Samdu VDCs of Terhathum District in Kosi Zone of eastern Nepal and has a height of 365 metres.

It has been stated, in an article in the Nepali Times, that the falls are "reportedly the largest in Asia". moreover, as per recent news published in various article it is the third highest in the Asia.

Tourism
Efforts are being made to encourage tourists in the area but at present facilities are not well developed. The waterfall is described as being at one day's walk from Myanglung bazaar.

See also
List of waterfalls of Nepal

References

Waterfalls of Nepal